Gregory Donhault (ca. 1555 – 4 April 1614), of London, was an English politician.

He was a Member (MP) of the Parliament of England for East Looe in 1593, Saltash in 1597, and Dunheved in 1601.

References

1550s births
1614 deaths
Members of the pre-1707 English Parliament for constituencies in Cornwall
English MPs 1593
English MPs 1597–1598
English MPs 1601